Tercüman-ı Hakikat was a daily newspaper published in Constantinople (today-Istanbul), Ottoman Empire between 1878 and 1921.

The first issue was published on June 26, 1878.

Among the news still quoted from this newspaper is one, dated 20 May 1880, that tells the story of a Rum (Greek Ottoman) girl that abandoned her home in Bursa and went to Istanbul together with a Sohte Mustafa, who converted her to Islam, an act which was appealed by the Greek Orthodox Archbishop before the Ottoman authorities, which got reverted right after.

References

External links 
 Ceviribilim web site

Turkish-language newspapers
Defunct newspapers published in the Ottoman Empire
Publications established in 1878
Publications disestablished in 1921
1878 establishments in the Ottoman Empire
Defunct daily newspapers
Newspapers published in Istanbul
Daily newspapers published in Turkey